Billy Nelson is a Scottish Boxing coach and a former boxer.

He was the trainer and coach of strongman Hafþór Júlíus Björnsson for his Titan-weight match in March, 2022 which Björnsson emerged victorious.

Nelson has also coached WBA super-featherweight, lightweight and light-welterweight champion Ricky Burns; Commonwealth super-middleweight champion David Brophy, lightweight and super-lightweight champion Willie Limond and featherweight champion John Simpson; British featherweight champion Paul Appleby and lightweight Lewis Ritson, IBF European cruiserweight champion Stephen Simmons and Congolese heavyweight Martin Bakole.

References

Scottish male boxers
Living people
Year of birth missing (living people)

British boxing trainers
Boxers from Glasgow